A Cyclonic Storm is a category used by the India Meteorological Department (IMD) to classify tropical cyclones, within the North Indian Ocean tropical cyclone basin between the Malay Peninsula and the Arabian Peninsula.

Background
The North Indian Ocean tropical cyclone basin is located to the north of the Equator, and encompasses the Bay of Bengal and the Arabian Sea, between the Malay Peninsula and the Arabian Peninsula. The basin is officially monitored by the India Meteorological Department's Regional Specialized Meteorological Centre in New Delhi, however, other national meteorological services such as the Bangladesh and Pakistan Meteorological Department's also monitor the basin.

Systems

Climatology

Landfalls

See also
 South-West Indian Ocean tropical cyclone

References

NIO CS